Allomethus is a genus of flies in the family Pipunculidae.

Species
Allomethus brimleyi Hardy, 1943
Allomethus catharinensis Rafael, 1991
Allomethus mysticus Rapp, 1943
Allomethus rotundicornis (Hardy, 1954)
Allomethus unicicolis Skevington, 2002

References

Pipunculidae
Brachycera genera
Diptera of North America
Diptera of South America
Diptera of Australasia
Taxa named by D. Elmo Hardy